George Robson Muir (1 May 1903 – 26 August 1970) was a Canadian farmer and politician. Muir served as a Progressive Conservative party member of the House of Commons of Canada. He was born in Margaret, Manitoba and became a farmer and seed grower by career.

He was first elected at the Lisgar riding in the 1957 general election, then was re-elected there in 1958, 1962, 1963, 1965 and 1968. However, Muir died in office on 26 August 1970 before completing his term in the 28th Canadian Parliament.

Muir died at his Roland, Manitoba home on 26 August 1970 aged 67.

References

External links
 

1903 births
1970 deaths
Members of the House of Commons of Canada from Manitoba
Progressive Conservative Party of Canada MPs